Harold Linwood Bowen (April 27, 1886—September 11, 1967) was bishop of the Episcopal Diocese of Colorado, serving from 1949 to 1955.

Early life and education
Bowen was born on April 27, 1886, in Dighton, Massachusetts, the son of David Irving Bowen and Rebecca Talbot Briggs. He was educated at the High School in Bedford, Massachusetts, before attending St Stephen's College, and then the University of Oklahoma, graduating with a Bachelor of Arts in 1909. He also studied at Seabury-Western Theological Seminary, earning a Bachelor of Divinity in 1918, and awarded a Doctor of Divinity in 1934.

Ordained Ministry
Bowen was ordained deacon in May 1910 and priest on June 4, 1911, by Bishop Francis Key Brooke of Oklahoma. He married Elizabeth Sherrill Cockle on September 5, 1916, and together had three children. Between 1914 and 1921, he served as priest at St Paul's Cathedral in Oklahoma City,  St Luke's Church in Chickasha, Oklahoma, St Mary's Church in Omaha, Nebraska, and St Paul's Church in Peoria, Illinois. In 1921, he became rector of St Peter's Church in Chicago, then in 1930, he became rector of St Mark's Church in Evanston, Illinois, where he remained till 1947.

Bishop
On May 19, 1947, Bowen was elected Coadjutor Bishop of Colorado on the forth ballot, during a diocesan convention held in St John's Cathedral. He was then consecrated on September 29, 1947, by Presiding Bishop Henry Knox Sherrill. He succeeded as diocesan bishop in 1949. During his episcopate, he worked to extend the missionary program of the diocese. He retired in 1955. Bowen died on September 11, 1967, in his home in San Diego, California, after a brief illness.

References

1967 deaths
1886 births
People from Dighton, Massachusetts
University of Oklahoma alumni
Episcopal bishops of Colorado